Shippan is an affluent section of the city of Stamford, Connecticut.

The Shippan section borders several other neighborhoods: to the south is Shippan Point, to the west is the South End, to the north is Downtown, to the northeast is the East Side, and to the east is The Cove. A few years ago, a few residents of Shippan Point (a section of Shippan) went to the mayor and asked to make Shippan a town itself, separated from Stamford. This idea was rejected by the mayor of Stamford.

The Shippan area includes Shippan Avenue, Elm Street and the smaller streets nearby. The area south of the intersection of Shippan Avenue and Magee Avenue is considered the Shippan Point neighborhood. To the north, the Metro-North train tracks and Interstate 95 separate Shippan from Downtown Stamford.

Neighborhood features
The neighborhood has a very integrated mix of ethnic groups and even ethnic stores, including Asian (Indian) stores and Italian pizzerias are on Cove Road, and European delis on Elm Street. Blacks, whites, Hispanics, Indians and others all live in Shippan.

The neighborhood includes Cummings Park public beach, St. Mary Roman Catholic Church, St. Benedict Roman Catholic Church, a supermarket, and many restaurants and small retail businesses.

A Clairol factory is located where the Shippan meets the Cove section on Cove Avenue. In 2008, Clairol Corporation announced plans to sell the facility.

Sewage treatment plant
The Stamford municipal sewage treatment plant, which also serves Darien, is located on Magee Avenue by the East Branch of Stamford Harbor. The city began treating sewage to remove nitrogen in 1988, and the 2005 upgrade increased the amount of nitrogen removed from sewage from 65 percent to 90 percent. The upgrade also included three odor-control machines at a total cost of $6 million. The machines use massive fans to suck odiferous fumes into chambers where chemicals are used to remove 99.9 percent of the hydrogen sulfide that causes the odor. An ultraviolet light disinfectant machine sterilizes the water in the plant and eliminates the need to use and store large amounts of chlorine.

Notes

External links
City of Stamford
Stamford Historical Society

Geography of Stamford, Connecticut
Neighborhoods in Connecticut